Khaf may refer to:

 Khaf County, Iran
 Khaf, Iran, the capital of Khaf County
 Kaph (letter)
 Half Moon Bay Airport, whose ICAO code is KHAF